Lion was a  74-gun ship of the line of the French Navy.

She took part in Allemand's expedition of 1805 under Captain Eleonore-Jean-Nicolas Soleil.

On 21 October 1809, she departed Toulon escorting a convoy bound to Barcelona. Six days into the journey, she encountered a British squadron sent by Admiral Cuthbert Collingwood, which gave chase. In the ensuing Battle of Maguelone, Lion ran aground near Sète, and was set on fire by her crew to avoid capture.

See also
 List of ships of the line of France

References

Footnotes

Bibliography

Ships of the line of the French Navy
Téméraire-class ships of the line
1804 ships
Ships built in France
Maritime incidents in 1809
Ship fires
Scuttled vessels
Shipwrecks in the Mediterranean Sea